This is a list of the best-selling albums in the United States based on RIAA certification and Nielsen SoundScan sales tracking. The criteria are that the album must have been published (including self-publishing by the artist), and the album must have achieved at least a diamond certification from the RIAA. The albums released prior to March 1991 should be included with their certified units only, as their Nielsen SoundScan sales are not complete.

Since February 2016, album certifications include "on-demand audio and video streams and a track sale equivalent" units.

Groupings are based on different benchmarks; the highest being for at least 20 million units, and the lowest being for multi-disc albums certified at least 10 times platinum and single-disc albums that have been certified at least 10 times platinum but with sales figures lower than 10,000,000. Albums are listed in order of units certified, or sales figures when available, by greatest to least.

As a result of the RIAA's methodology of counting each disc in a multi-disc set as one unit toward certification, most double albums on the list—such as Pink Floyd's The Wall and Outkast's Speakerboxxx/The Love Below—have been certified with a number double the number of copies sold. Such albums have the shipments of copies, not discs, indicated. Conversely, the certification level for double albums that fit onto one compact disc such as the Saturday Night Fever soundtrack reflect the actual number of copies sold.

The albums in this list are ordered first by number of units, then by platinum awards received, and finally by artist name and album title.

Albums with two references for their estimated actual sales include sales through BMG Music Club. Albums with three references for their estimated actual sales include sales through BMG Music Club and Columbia House.

The best-selling album in the United States is Their Greatest Hits (1971–1975) by the Eagles.

20 million or more copies

15–19 million copies

10–14 million copies

Fewer than 10 million copies

Notes

See also 

 Album era
 List of best-selling albums
 List of highest-certified music artists in the United States
 List of best-selling music artists
 Lists of best-selling albums by country
 List of best-selling singles
 Best-selling albums in the United States since Nielsen SoundScan tracking began
 Best-selling albums by year in the United States
 List of best-selling Latin albums in the United States
 List of best-selling albums of the 21st century
 List of best-selling films in the United States

References

External links 
 RIAA Website
 RIAA "Top 100" Albums
 Billboard Magazine,– a magazine that publishes weekly music rankings

American music industry
United States